The Royal Belgian Cycling League or KBWB/RLVB (in Dutch: Koninklijke Belgische Wielrijdersbond, in French: Royale Ligue vélocipédique belge) is the national governing body of cycle racing in Belgium. It was founded on 11 November 1882.

The KBWB-RLVB is a member of the UCI and the UEC.

See also
 Cycle racing in Belgium
 Belgian records in track cycling
 Belgian Road Cycling Cup
 Belgian National Cyclo-cross Championships
 Belgian National Road Race Championships
 Belgian National Time Trial Championships
 Ardennes classics
 Flanders Classics

References

External links
 Royal Belgian Cycling League official website

Belgian
Cycle racing organizations
Cycling
Cycle racing in Belgium
Organisations based in Belgium with royal patronage
1882 establishments in Belgium
Sports organizations established in 1882